Agh Shani (also known as Agh Shany or White Shani) is a light yellow-skinned white table grape that have also been exported and are grown in various regions of Azerbaijan and in Derbend, Astrakhan and Volgograd, Russia.

Origins and specifics
Ag Shani is among the 50 varieties of grapes that are indigenous to Absheron Peninsula. By degree of sugar content, Shani is superior to all other Absheron varieties, primarily due to soil and climatic conditions on the peninsula.

The variety of Agh Shani is also grown with Qara Shani (Black Shani) in Mardakan and Bilgah. The shape of the grape is conical, its bushes are winged. Seeds of Agh Shani are large and round. Color is light yellow and when fully mature, the color sometimes turns golden yellow. Skin is medium thick and it has tough and thin layer of wax. In Mardakan, the seeds of Agh Shani start to ripen around August 20, in other parts of Absheron in the first decade of September and in Ganja in mid September.

Use of Agh Shani
According to new plans of the Ministry of Agriculture of Azerbaijan, Agh Shani will be one of varieties to be grown extensively in Goygol, Shamakhi, Agsu, Samukh, Qabala, Tovuz, Shamkir, Jalilabad, Kurdamir and Ismayilli raions.

The leaves of Agh (White) and Qara (Black) Shani are extensively used for cooking of Dolma which it gives the meal a distinguishing taste.

See also
Azerbaijani wine
Madrasa - grape variety in Azerbaijan  and Armenia
Azerbaijani cuisine

References

White wine grape varieties